Artiora evonymaria is a species of moth belonging to the family Geometridae.

It is native to Europe.

References

Geometridae
Moths described in 1775